The Dark-Thirty: Southern Tales of the Supernatural, is a children's thriller book, filled with ten tales of supernatural activity occurring throughout times of slavery and civil rights in the south. The authors of the book, Patricia McKissack and Fredrick McKissack, husband and wife, are known for their writings about African American culture. The illustrator of this book is Brian Pinkney, who has illustrated many highly acclaimed children's picture books.  The Dark Thirty: Southern Tales of the Supernatural was published in 1992 and received a Newbery Honor along with a Coretta Scott King Award in 1993.

Plot summaries
 
The Legend of Pin Oak tells the story of Henri, a free biracial man married to an enslaved woman. When his white half-brother, Harper, sells Henri’s wife and child, the family flees and has to make a life or death decision.

We Organized is about a slave who was freed before Abraham Lincoln signed the Emancipation Proclamation. His narrative describes voodoo rituals performed by slaves against their master.

Justice: Riley Holt, the richest man in Tallahatchie, Mississippi, is murdered. White garage owner Hoop Granger blames black veterinary student Alvin Tinsley for the crime, and gathers a group of his fellow Klansmen to lynch Alvin. After Alvin's murder, Hoop is haunted when the true story of Riley Holt's death refuses to disappear from his windows.

The 11:59: Lester Simmons, an old Pullman car porter, tells about the train called the 11:59. No porter hears the whistle of the 11:59 and lives. One night Lester hears the whistle of the 11:59 and tries to escape.

The Sight: Esau is born with a veil and according to the midwife has a gift called the sight, which could be blessing or a curse. Esau sees future visions and succeeds at controlling the visions, but is forced to use his ability for evil when his father Tall comes back.

The Woman in the Snow: Grady Bishop, a white bus driver, is assigned the route nicknamed the "Blackbird Express". On a snowy night, Grady sees a young black woman, Eula Mae Daniels, with a baby struggling to get through the snow. Grady refuses to allow her on the bus because she has no fare, and Eula Mae and her baby freeze to death. Their ghosts haunt the bus line until a black driver sets them free years later.

The Conjure Brother is about Josie, who badly wanted a little brother. In hopes that her mom would get pregnant, by eating a lot of food, but her mother stayed skinny and barely ate. Josie asks the town's conjure woman if she could help her. Upon granting Josie's wish, the conjure woman gave her precise directions to follow. Josie did not follow the directions and ends up with a big brother.

Boo Mama: A toddler named Nealy disappears from outside his house. After a year Nealy is found on church steps and seems in good condition, but has developed an unknown language, perplexing Leddy, his mother. As time passes, Leddy realizes that a supernatural creature took care of Nealy during his disappearance.

The Gingi is about Laura who bought a beautiful artifact, but was warned by Mrs. Aswadi that it might be evil. Mrs. Aswadi gave her a gift that would later be used to protect them from the evil of the Dabobo woman.

The Chicken-Coop Monster is about Missy, who stays with her grandparents and is sure there is a monster in the chicken coop. As President of the Monster Watchers of America, she uses her monster rules to steer clear of the Chicken Coop Monster.

Characters

The Legend of Pin Oak
 Harper McAvoy - Slave master and white son of Amos McAvoy and Alva Dean
 Henri McAvoy - Mulatto son of Amos McAvoy and Mary DuPriest
 Charlemae - Wife of Henri

We Organized
 Massa, slave master
 Ajax, slave freed by Massa

Justice
 Riley Holt, richest white man in Tallahatchie, Mississippi
 Hoop Granger, white man who accused Alvin of committing crimes
 Chief Baker, Mississippi police officer and investigator for the Holt case
 Alvin Tinsley, black man blamed by Hoop Granger for the killing of Riley Holt

The 11:59
 Lester Simmons, a Pullman car porter

The Sight
 Amanda Mayes, Esau's mother
 Esau Mayes, Amanda and Tall Mayes's son and born with the gift to predict the future
 Tall Mayes, Esau's father
 Charity Rose, Esau's wife

The Woman in the Snow
 Grady Bishop, white bus driver of the Hall Street Express aka the Blackbird Express
 Eula Mae Daniels, young black mother who pleads for a ride to get her baby to the hospital and ghost of the Hall Street Express Route
 Ray Hammond, black bus driver who sets Eula Mae Daniels free

The Conjure Brother
 Josie, Hudson family's daughter
 JoBeth, Josie's friend
 Arthur Lee, Josie's friend
 Madam Zinnia, the conjure woman
 Adam, Josie's older brother

Boo Mama
 Leddy, activist who moved to Orchard City, Tennessee with her son
 Nealy, Leddy's son who went missing
 Germaine, Leddy's friend
 Sylvia, Leddy's friend
 Boo Mama, human like bear creature named Noss and saved Nealy's life 
 Sheriff Martin, Orchard City sheriff

The Gingi
 Laura Bates, mother who bought the ebony sculpture
 Lizzie, Laura's daughter and released the gingi's powers
 Mrs. Aswadi, Ghanaian woman who sold the ebony sculpture to Laura
 Jack, Laura's husband
 Thomas Lester, Laura's son
 August, family cat
 The Dabobo Woman, evil witch disguised in the ebony sculpture

The Chicken-Coop Monster
 Missy, Franky and James Leon Russell's granddaughter and president of the Monster Watchers of America
 Franky Russell, Missy's grandmother
 James Leon Russell, Missy's grandfather
 Jay, Missy's friend and fellow member of the MWA

Themes
 Slavery
 Underground Railroad
 Abolition
 Magic and Supernatural
 Civil Rights Movement
 African American

Awards
 Newbery Medal Honor Book
 Coretta Scott King Award winner
 ALA Notable Children's Book
 NCSS-CBC Notable Children's Trade Book in the Field of Social Studies
 IRA Teacher's Choice

References

1992 short story collections
1992 children's books
American short story collections
Children's short story collections
Thriller short story collections
American children's books
Supernatural fiction
Books by Patricia McKissack
Random House books